St. Mary's Church, Leamington Spa is a Grade II listed parish church in Leamington Spa, England.

History 

St. Mary's Church was built between 1838 and 1839 to designs by the architect J.G. Jackson. 1897 saw a vicarage purchased at 15 St Mary's Road for £1,500 and the current vicarage (number 28) is also on the same street as the church. In the 1970s a substantial property called "Southlands" was left to the church. This was promptly sold and a former brewery warehouse called The Maltings was purchased and used as a church youth centre called "The Landing Stage". The Maltings were sold and converted to housing by the Orbit Group. The existing church hall was completed in 1996.

References

Gothic Revival church buildings in England
Gothic Revival architecture in Warwickshire
Leamington, St Mary
Buildings and structures in Leamington Spa
Leamington, St Mary
Churches completed in 1839